The General's Prosecutor Office of the Republic of Azerbaijan is an independent constitutional agency responsible for managing the criminal investigation and public prosecution in the Republic of Azerbaijan.

Overview 
The powers of the Prosecutor’s Office of the Republic of Azerbaijan are defined in the Constitution 1995, Criminal Procedure Code 2000 and other laws. According to Article 133 of the Constitution 1995, the Prosecutor's Office: 
 exercises control over the execution and application of laws;  
 institutes criminal cases and conducts investigations (limited range of offences);
 has exclusive power to prosecute on behalf of the state in all criminal courts;
 institutes lawsuits (in a limited range) and appeals against court judgements.

Unlike many other jurisdictions, the Prosecutor's Office of  Azerbaijan belongs to the  Judicial Branch of Power. The Prosecutor’s Office operates as a single centralised body based on the subordination of territorial and specialised prosecutors to the Prosecutor General (PG) of the Republic of Azerbaijan. The PG is appointed and dismissed by the President of the Republic of
Azerbaijan, with the consent of the Milli Majlis (Parliament) of the Republic of Azerbaijan. Apart from the prosecutors and supporting staff, there are also criminal investigators and detectives within the Prosecutor's Office of Azerbaijan. Criminal investigators of the Prosecutor's Office have exclusive jurisdiction over a limited range of serious offences, including crimes against the person, corruption, money laundering, etc. The Anticorruption Directorate (anti-corruption agency) is the only entity of the Prosecutor's Office that employs detectives.

In addition to its main functions predominantly in the criminal law area, the Prosecutor's Office is entitled to submit drafts of the legislative proposals directly to the Parliament, a function by enjoyed by few agencies. Prosecutors are empowered to initiate administrative (quasi-criminal) and disciplinary proceedings and submit motions for the elimination of conditions and circumstances conducive to criminal offences, which they discover in the course of their activity. These motions are mandatory for consideration by state and private institutions. Finally, prosecutors have limited authority to represent the state institutions and vulnerable citizens in civil court proceedings.

Former President Heydar Aliyev established 1 October as a professional holiday of the Office in July 1998.

History 
The history of the prosecuting authorities in the independent Azerbaijan state began after the establishment of the Azerbaijan Democratic Republic. Regulation on the Chamber of the Court of Azerbaijan was approved by the Council of Ministers on November 18, 1918.

Fatali Khan KHOYSKI, Khalil Bay KHASMAMMADOV, A.Safikurdski, T.Makinski were Ministers of Justice and chief prosecutors as well of the Azerbaijan Democratic Republic. Azerbaijan Democratic Republic was collapsed on April 28, 1920, at the invasion of 11th Army (RSFSR). Declaration of the Azerbaijani Soviet Socialist Republic ensued. The prosecution and investigation bodies were also abolished along with the public authorities after the collapse of Independent Azerbaijan Statehood.

Taking into account the need of establishment of a special body to control activities of all authorities in this period, the Soviet Prosecutor's Office was founded in Azerbaijan SSR with the decree of the Central Executive Committee of Azerbaijan  ‘On the Public Prosecutor's Office of Azerbaijani SSR’ dated July 11, 1922.
After the restoration of independence in 1991, the Prosecutor's Office of Azerbaijan was established according to the Constitutional Provision, Prosecutor's Office Act 1999 and the Prosecutor's Office (Service) Act 2001. In order to part with the legacy and turn into a democratic institution, it has undergone substantial reforms.

System of the Prosecutor's Office of the Republic of Azerbaijan

  General Prosecutor's Office of the Republic of Azerbaijan (Main Body)
  Anti-Corruption Directorate with the Prosecutor General
  Military Prosecutor's Office of the Republic of Azerbaijan
  Prosecutor's Office of Nakhchivan Autonomous Republic (NAR)
  Military Prosecutor's Office of NAR
  Metropolitan Prosecutor's Office of Baku city
  District (city) prosecutor's offices of the republic
  Territorial military prosecutor's offices
  District (city) prosecutor's offices of (NAR)
  District prosecutor's offices of Baku city

Structure of the Prosecutor's Office

Management
 Prosecutor General of the Republic of Azerbaijan - (Kamran Aliyev since May 1, 2020)
 First Deputy Prosecutor General of the Republic of Azerbaijan
 Deputy Prosecutor General of the Republic of Azerbaijan
 Deputy Prosecutor General - ex officio Head of the Anti-Corruption Directorate
 Deputy Prosecutor General - ex officio Military Prosecutor of the Republic of Azerbaijan
 Senior assistants and assistants to the Prosecutor General

Departments
General Prosecutor's Office:
 4 Departments overseeing the implementation of laws in the course of (pre-trial) criminal inquiry and investigation, as well as operational-search activities (special investigation means) by the following institutions:
 Prosecutor's Office (regional bodies) - except for SIM 
 Internal Affairs Bodies (Mainly police)
 Ministries of Justice and Taxes, and the State Customs Committee
 National Security and Emergency Situations, the State Border Service
 Department for Public Prosecution (Court Unit) 
 Department for the Consideration of Applications
 Organizational and Analytical Department
 HR Department
 Department of International Relations
 Department of Legal Support and Information
 Science and Education Center (Department)
 Department of Logistics

Anti-Corruption Directorate with the Prosecutor General
Anti-Corruption Directorate with the Prosecutor General of the Azerbaijan Republic was established by the Order № 114 of the President of the Azerbaijan Republic dated March 3, 2004. Anti-Corruption Directorate with the Prosecutor General is a specialised law enforcement anti-corruption agency. It is an autonomous Prosecution Service operating in the field of Special Investigation Techniques and criminal pre-trial investigation. According to the Operational Search Act 1999, it is the body with an exclusive power to carry out SIMs in the fight against corruption. The ACD structure is as follows,
 ACD Investigation Department
 ACD Analysis and Information Department
 ACD Preventive Measures and Inquiry Department
 ACD Operational Department (SIM)
 ACD Operational Support Division (SIM Tech Support)
 ACD Internal Security Division
 ACD Specialist Division

References 

1918 in Azerbaijan
Government of Azerbaijan
Politics of Azerbaijan
Law of Azerbaijan